The Young–Almas House is a site on the National Register of Historic Places located in Havre, Montana.

It was designed by local architect Frank Bossuot, following photos taken by Mr. Young of a plantation house in Cuba.  It was built in 1914 with masonry and terra cotta roofing by contractor Chris Fuglevand.  It has also been known as Eliason Funeral Home, which was housed in an addition.  It was added to the Register on October 14, 1980.  It is a stucco building in the Spanish Revival style.

References

Houses on the National Register of Historic Places in Montana
Houses in Hill County, Montana
Spanish Revival architecture in the United States
National Register of Historic Places in Hill County, Montana
Houses completed in 1914
Mission Revival architecture in Montana
1914 establishments in Montana